The Slovakia women's national under-16 basketball team is a national basketball team of Slovakia, administered by the Slovak Basketball Association. It represents the country in women's international under-16 basketball competitions.

FIBA U16 Women's European Championship participations

FIBA Under-17 Women's Basketball World Cup participations

See also
Slovakia women's national basketball team
Slovakia women's national under-19 basketball team
Slovakia men's national under-16 basketball team

References

External links
Archived records of Slovakia team participations

Basketball in Slovakia
Basketball
Women's national under-16 basketball teams